Nairanjana may refer to the Lilajan River in India. It is also an Indian female given name. Notable people with the name include:

Nairanjana Dasgupta, Indian statistician
Nairanjana Ghosh, Indian journalist and television personality

Indian feminine given names